The 1933 Christchurch mayoral election was part of the New Zealand local elections held that same year. In 1933, election were held for the Mayor of Christchurch plus 16 councillors and other local government positions.

Background
Sitting mayor Dan Sullivan sought re-election for a second term. The Citizens' Association, whose leaders had cooperated well with Sullivan during the term, decided not to put up an opposing candidate "... the Citizens' Association's leading councillors declined to stand against Sullivan and only a somewhat eccentric Independent, Lancelot Walker, opposed him. Walker favoured some grandiose schemes and Sullivan appeared safely conservative in comparison."

Mayoral results
The following table gives the election results:

Council results
The following table gives the overall party strengths and vote distribution.

The following table gives the initial candidate preferences totals and sorted by the vote distribution after the 720th (final) count.

Notes

References

Mayoral elections in Christchurch
1933 elections in New Zealand
Politics of Christchurch
1930s in Christchurch